The third USS Chesapeake and second USS Severn was a three-masted, sheathed, wooden-hulled full-rigged ship with auxiliary steam power in commission in the United States Navy during most of the period between 1900 and 1916.

Construction and commissioning
USS Chesapeake was laid down on 2 August 1898 by Bath Iron Works at Bath, Maine. She was launched on 30 June 1899, sponsored by Miss Elise Bradford, and commissioned on 12 April 1900.

Service history

As Chesapeake
Chesapeake was towed to Annapolis, Maryland, where she assumed duties as station ship and as training ship for midshipmen at the United States Naval Academy. Renamed Severn on 15 June 1905, she decommissioned twice for repair and overhaul, provided facilities for seamanship drills at the Naval Academy and conducted summer cruises off southern New England through 1909.

As Severn
On 15 February 1910, Severn was ordered refitted as a submarine tender. On completion of that work in mid-May 1910, she reported for duty with the 3rd Submarine Division. Until 1913, she performed submarine tender duties off New England during the summer and in the Chesapeake Bay during the winter, her movements being accomplished under tow. She was decommissioned a third time for overhaul after summer maneuvers in 1913.

Severn was recommissioned on 15 November 1913 and transferred to the Panama Canal Zone. She arrived at Coco Solo, Panama, on 12 December 1913 and served as tender to the 1st Submarine Division until July 1916.

Severn was ordered back to the United States in July 1916. She arrived at Norfolk, Virginia, under tow by collier , on 1 August 1916.

Final decommissioning and disposal
Severn was decommissioned for the last time on 3 October 1916. She was sold to F. G. McDonald of Ardmore, Pennsylvania, on 7 December 1916.

References

1899 ships
Auxiliary steamers
Ships built in Bath, Maine
Submarine tenders of the United States Navy
Training ships of the United States Navy
World War I auxiliary ships of the United States